Sonamai, सोनामाई is a village development committee in Mahottari District in the Janakpur Zone of south-eastern Nepal. At the time of the 2011 Nepal census it had a population of 8,973 people living in 1,662 individual households.

Sonamai has a substantial tourism industry due to its significance in Hinduism and being the place of Goddess.

References

External links
UN map of the municipalities of Mahottari District

Populated places in Mahottari District